Munditia tasmanica, common name the Tasmanian liotia, is a species of small sea snail, a marine gastropod mollusk, in the family Liotiidae.

Description
(Original description by J.E. Tenison-Woods) The height of the shell attains 3 mm, its diameter 8 mm. The small, sordidly white shell has a discoid shape. The spire is plano-depressed, ornamented thickly with spiral sub-obsolete ribs and longitudinal lirae, with two nodose keels at the periphery. The nodes in the second whorl are raised and imbricated. The nodes on the upper carina become little raised hollow rounded squamae on the second whorl. The aperture has a  reflexed and thickened margin. The umbilicus is very wide and spirally dentate. This shell is nacreous within.

Distribution
This marine species is endemic to Australia. It occurs off New South Wales, South Australia, Tasmania and Victoria

References

 Tenison-Woods, J.E. 1876. Descriptions of New Shells. Papers and Proceedings of the Royal Society of Tasmania 1875: 134-162
 Tenison-Woods, J.E. 1876. On some new Tasmanian marine shells. Papers and Proceedings of the Royal Society of Tasmania 1876: 131-159
 Angas, G.F. 1865. On the marine molluscan fauna of the Province of South Australia, with a list of all the species known up to the present time, together with remarks on their habitats and distribution, etc. Proceedings of the Zoological Society of London 1865: 155-"180" 
 Tate, R. 1899. A revision of the Australian Cyclostrematidae and Liotiidae. Transactions of the Royal Society of South Australia 23(2): 213-229
 Cotton, B.C. 1945. Southern Australian Gastropoda. Part 1. Streptoneura. Transactions of the Royal Society of South Australia 69(1): 150-171
 Cotton, B.C. 1959. South Australian Mollusca. Archaeogastropoda. Handbook of the Flora and Fauna of South Australia. Adelaide : South Australian Government Printer 449 pp.
 Jenkins, B.W. 1984. Southern Australian Liotiidae. Australian Shell News 47: 3-5 
 Wilson, B. 1993. Australian Marine Shells. Prosobranch Gastropods. Kallaroo, Western Australia : Odyssey Publishing Vol. 1 408 pp

External links
 To World Register of Marine Species
 

tasmanica
Gastropods described in 1875